Atash Taqipour (was born 1945 in khoy, West Azerbaijan) is an Iranian theater, cinema and TV actor. Taqipour has played in famous movies in TV and Cinema  such as Shaheed-e-Kufa, Dame sobh and Mosafer.

References

External links
 Atash Taqipour in Internet Movie Database
 Atash Taqipour in Internet database of Soureh Cinema

Living people
Iranian male film actors
Iranian male stage actors
Iranian male television actors
People from Khoy
1945 births